National Tertiary Route 912, or just Route 912 (or ) is a National Road Route of Costa Rica, located in the Guanacaste province.

Description
In Guanacaste province the route covers Carrillo canton (Palmira, Sardinal districts).

References

Highways in Costa Rica